Stages of a Long Journey is a live album by German double bassist and composer Eberhard Weber recorded in Germany in 2005 and released on the ECM label.

Reception

The AllMusic review by Thom Jurek states, "This is a watershed moment in Weber's recorded output, because it reveals his collective gifts as a musician, which, even when understated, are shining examples of the European jazz, folk, classical, and new music he has forged these last 40 years as a leader and as a valued sideman and composer". All About Jazz called it "A compelling retrospective that demonstrates the malleability, melodism and beauty of Weber's oeuvre, Stages of a Long Journey'''s omission of two words from its source—the bassist's "The Last Stage of a Long Journey," which receives an expansive and expanded orchestral treatment—makes it thankfully clear that this recording is simply a milestone, not an ending".

Track listingAll compositions by Eberhard Weber except as indicated''
 "Silent Feet" - 7:37
 "Syndrome" (Carla Bley) - 7:44
 "Yesterdays" (Jerome Kern, Otto Harbach) - 5:03
 "Seven Movements" - 5:54
 "The Colours of Chloë" - 7:19
 "Piano Transition" - 4:11
 "Maurizius" - 7:04
 "Percussion Transition" (Marilyn Mazur) - 3:03
 "Yellow Fields" - 7:01
 "Hang Around" (Reto Weber) - 4:17
 "The Last Stage of a Long Journey" - 11:06
 "Air" - 3:10

Personnel
Eberhard Weber - bass
Jan Garbarek - soprano saxophone, tenor saxophone (tracks 1, 2, 4-9 & 11)
Gary Burton - vibraphone (tracks 1, 2, 5-9 & 11)
Rainer Bruninghaus (tracks 1, 2, 5-9 & 11), Wolfgang Dauner (track 3) - piano
Marilyn Mazur - percussion (tracks 1, 2, 5-9 & 11) 
Nino G. - beatbox (track 10)
Reto Weber - hang (track 10)
Stuttgart Radio Symphony Orchestra conducted by Roland Kluttig (tracks 1, 5-9 & 11)

References

ECM Records live albums
Eberhard Weber live albums
2007 live albums